The Orlando Solar Bears are a professional ice hockey team that plays their home games at the Amway Center in Orlando, Florida. They play in the South Division of the ECHL's Eastern Conference and are affiliated with the Tampa Bay Lightning of the National Hockey League and Syracuse Crunch of the American Hockey League.

History
Orlando Pro Hockey Operations, L.P. and primary owners Joe Haleski, Bob Ohrablo, and Jason Siegel, obtained an expansion franchise in the ECHL in November 2011. The team revived the name of the original Orlando Solar Bears, who played in the International Hockey League from 1995 to 2001. The franchise also retained the original colors of their IHL predecessor, while adding the color Sunrise Gold. They are Orlando's third professional hockey team, after the original Solar Bears and Orlando Seals (2002–2004). Together with the Florida Everblades of Estero and the Jacksonville Icemen, they are one of three ECHL franchises in Florida. They are the eighth ECHL franchise to have the name of a previous IHL franchise, joining four current teams (Cincinnati Cyclones, Fort Wayne Komets, Utah Grizzlies and Kalamazoo Wings) and three former teams (the defunct Phoenix Roadrunners and Long Beach Ice Dogs; and the Peoria Rivermen).

The Solar Bears utilize RDV Sportsplex Ice Den as their training facility and offices.

For their first season in 2012–13, the team became affiliated with the Minnesota Wild of the NHL and the Houston Aeros of the AHL. They hired former NHL player Drake Berehowsky as the team's first head coach. During their inaugural season, the Solar Bears posted a 20–11–1–4 record on home ice; however, the team struggled on the road and missed the playoffs with a 28–27–7 overall record.

The Solar Bears then named Vince Williams, a former Solar Bears defenseman, as head coach for the 2013–14 season. They also added an affiliation with the Toronto Maple Leafs of the NHL and the Toronto Marlies of the AHL while also keeping the Wild as an affiliate. The Leafs extended their affiliation with the Solar Bears for an additional two years in 2014 and the Leafs became the Solar Bears' sole NHL affiliate.

The Solar Bears hosted the 2015 ECHL All-Star Game at Amway Center on January 21, 2015.

For the 2015–16 season, Anthony Noreen became the head coach of the Solar Bears after guiding the United States Hockey League's Youngstown Phantoms to the league championship and being named USHL Coach of the Year. The Solar Bears also renewed their affiliation with the Maple Leafs and Marlies. The Solar Bears missed the 2016 playoffs and then started the 2016–17 season with a 5-5-1-0 record. On November 14, 2016, head coach Anthony Noreen was replaced by former Solar Bears' head coach Drake Berehowsky.

In May 2017, the DeVos family, owners of the Orlando Magic, agreed to purchase the Solar Bears when the Orlando Pro Hockey Operations, L.P. ownership group informed them that they could no longer sustain the team. The DeVos family were the owners of the IHL Solar Bears from 1995 through 2001.

In the 2018 Kelly Cup playoffs, the Solar Bears swept the South Carolina Stingrays to win their first playoff series, before losing to the regular season champions, the Florida Everblades, in the division finals. After the season, the Solar Bears and the Toronto Maple Leafs ended their five-season affiliation when Toronto affiliated with the expansion Newfoundland Growlers team. The Solar Bears then affiliated with the Tampa Bay Lightning on a three-year agreement, which was then extended through at least the 2022–23 season.

On April 25, 2022, the team announced that they and Drake Berehowsky had mutually agreed to part ways.

Media
The radio broadcasts for Orlando Solar Bears games are streamed online through iHeart Radio on the online channel for WYGM "740 the Game" and on Mixlr. News6 WKMG broadcasts select games throughout the season. Joey Battaino, formerly of the OHL’s Saginaw Spirit, is the play-by-play announcer for the Solar Bears. 

As with all ECHL teams, video of Orlando Solar Bears games are available on FloSports and ECHL.TV, usually with a choice between home or away radio feeds for audio. The 2022-2023 season home opener was simulcast on WKMG-TV (Orlando's CBS affiliate) and Cozi TV.

Season-by-season results

Players

Current roster
Updated December 9, 2022.

References

External links

ECHL press release announcing Orlando's membership

Tampa Bay Lightning minor league affiliates
Toronto Maple Leafs minor league affiliates
ECHL teams
Ice hockey teams in Orlando, Florida
Ice hockey clubs established in 2011
2011 establishments in Florida
Minnesota Wild minor league affiliates